Katádfa is a small village in Baranya county, Hungary.

External links 
 http://www.katadfa.hu 

Populated places in Baranya County